Angel Manuel "Andy" González (born December 15, 1981) is a Puerto Rican former professional baseball outfielder and third baseman. He played in Major League Baseball (MLB) for the Chicago White Sox, Cleveland Indians, and Florida Marlins.

Career

Minor leagues
He steadily advanced through Chicago's minor league system and made his major league debut on April 25, . In 189 at-bats in the majors in 2007, González batted only .185. After the season, the White Sox did not tender González a contract making him a free agent.

On December 21, 2007, he signed a minor league contract with the Cleveland Indians with an invitation to spring training. After not making the team out of spring training, González began the year with Triple-A Buffalo. He was called up to the majors on July 26, to fill the roster following the trade of Casey Blake. He was designated for assignment on August 29 and became a free agent at the end of the season.

In January , he signed a minor league contract with the Florida Marlins. He made the team out of spring training, and was added to the major league roster on April 4, 2009. On October 9, 2009, the Florida Marlins outrighted him to the New Orleans Zephyrs and he opted for free agency. On April 29, 2010, the Sussex Skyhawks signed González. He signed a minor league deal with the Milwaukee Brewers in late April 2011.

Puerto Rico Baseball League
In 2008, González played with the Leones de Ponce of the Puerto Rico Baseball League. He won the league's regular season batting championship. Registering an average of .387 in 41 games played. In the semifinals, González had an average of .313 with one RBI.

Post-playing career
On December 14, 2021, González was hired by the Colorado Rockies as an assistant hitting coach for the 2022 season.

Personal
He attended Florida Air Academy in Melbourne, Florida.

See also
 List of Major League Baseball players from Puerto Rico

References

External links

1981 births
Living people
Arizona League White Sox players
Birmingham Barons players
Bristol White Sox players
Buffalo Bisons (minor league) players
Charlotte Knights players
Chicago White Sox players
Cleveland Indians players
Criollos de Caguas players
Florida Marlins players
Huntsville Stars players
Kannapolis Intimidators players
Leones de Ponce players
Liga de Béisbol Profesional Roberto Clemente infielders
Liga de Béisbol Profesional Roberto Clemente outfielders
Major League Baseball infielders
Major League Baseball outfielders
Major League Baseball players from Puerto Rico
Minor league baseball managers
Nashville Sounds players
New Orleans Zephyrs players
People from Río Piedras, Puerto Rico
Reading Fightin Phils players
Winston-Salem Warthogs players
York Revolution players
2009 World Baseball Classic players
2013 World Baseball Classic players